Pei Xuan may refer to:

 Pei Xuan (Three Kingdoms) (裴玄), Three Kingdoms period scholar
 Pei Xuan (Water Margin) (裴宣), Water Margin character